{|

{{Infobox ship career
|Hide header=title
|Ship country=United Kingdom
|Ship flag=
|Ship name=HMS P552|Ship acquired=20 April 1942
|Ship commissioned=
|Ship decommissioned=
|Ship in service=
|Ship out of service=
|Ship struck=
|Ship fate=Suffered a collision in Durban harbor and declared unseaworthy, January 1944, nominally returned to the United States and sold for scrap locally
}}

|}USS S-1 (SS-105)''' was the lead boat of the S class of submarines of the United States Navy.

Construction and commissioning
The U.S. Navy had awarded contracts for the first three S-boats under the same general specifications but of different design types. S-1 was what was known as a "Holland-type", while  was a "Lake-type" and  a "Government-type".S-1s prime contractor, the Electric Boat Company, subcontracted her construction to the Fore River Shipbuilding Company of Quincy, Massachusetts. Her keel was laid down on 11 December 1917. She was launched on 26 October 1918, sponsored by Mrs. Emory S. Land, and commissioned on 5 June 1920.

Service history

United States Navy

Inter-war periodS-1 began her service operations in July 1920 with a cruise to Bermuda attached to Submarine Division 2 (SubDiv 2), with subsequent operations out of New London, Connecticut, cruising the New England coast until 1923.

On 2 January 1923, she shifted to SubDiv Zero, a division created for experimental work, and conducted winter maneuvers in the Caribbean Sea. As a single-ship division, SubDiv Zero, she returned to New London in the spring to continue experimental duty.

As part of a series of studies conducted by the United States Navy after World War I into the possibility of submarine-borne observation and scouting aircraft, S-1 became the experimental platform for this project late in 1923. She was altered by having a steel capsule mounted abaft the conning tower; a cylindrical pod which could house a small collapsible seaplane, the Martin MS-1. After surfacing, this plane could be rolled out, quickly assembled, and launched by ballasting the sub until the deck was awash. These experiments were carried out into 1926 using the Martin-built plane, constructed of wood and fabric, and the all-metal Cox-Klemin versions, XS-1 and XS-2. The first full cycle of surfacing, assembly, launching, retrieving, disassembly, and submergence took place on 28 July 1926, on the Thames River at New London.

Following the aircraft experiments, S-1 served as flagship for SubDiv 2 until July 1927, when she was transferred to SubDiv 4. While attached to this division, she made operational cruises to the Panama Canal Zone in 1928–1930, during the spring months. She visited ports at Cristobal, Canal Zone and Coco Solo, Canal Zone; Cartagena, Colombia; Kingston, Jamaica; and Guantánamo Bay, Cuba, during these cruises, and spent the remaining months of those years operating along the New England coast, out of New London.

January 1931 found her at Pearl Harbor. She remained there into 1937; first, attached to SubDiv 7, SubRon 4, then, from July 1932 – July 1933, attached to Rotating Reserve SubDiv 14. She was returned to SubDiv 7 in August, and remained with that division until departing in May 1937 for Philadelphia. S-1 arrived at Philadelphia on 22 July and commenced overhaul for deactivation. She was decommissioned on 20 October.

World War II
On 16 October 1940, S-1 was recommissioned at Philadelphia. She then made two cruises to Bermuda, training submariners, and returned to Philadelphia from the second cruise on 7 December 1941. There, she prepared for transfer to Britain under the Lend-Lease program. She was decommissioned and turned over to the British on 20 April 1942. Her name was struck from the Naval Vessel Register on 24 June.

Royal NavyS-1 served the Royal Navy as HMS P.552'' as a training vessel for anti-submarine warfare. In poor condition after arriving in Durban, Natal, South Africa, she was often in repair and she was declared unseaworthy in January 1944.

She was returned to the U.S. Navy at Durban on 16 October 1944, where she was stripped of vital parts and machinery, and her hull was sold for local scrapping on 20 July 1945 and she was scrapped there on 14 September of that year.

References

 

United States S-class submarines
Ships built in Quincy, Massachusetts
1918 ships
World War II submarines of the United States
Ships transferred from the United States Navy to the Royal Navy
United States S-class submarines of the Royal Navy
World War II submarines of the United Kingdom